Glyphiulus, is a genus of millipedes belonging to the order Spirostreptida, family Cambalopsidae. It is the largest Southeast Asian millipede genus comprise about 47 to 57 species ranging from southern China, northern Laos, and northern Thailand in the north to southern Vietnam in the south. The type species shows a pantropical distribution. The number of species always changes due to continuous discoveries of new species.

Species
Glyphiulus adeloglyphus
Glyphiulus anophthalmus
Glyphiulus balazsi
Glyphiulus basalis
Glyphiulus bedosae
Glyphiulus beroni
Glyphiulus calceus
Glyphiulus capucinus
Glyphiulus costulifer
Glyphiulus deharvengi
Glyphiulus foetidus
Glyphiulus formosus
Glyphiulus granulatus
Glyphiulus guangnanensis
Glyphiulus impletus
Glyphiulus intermedius
Glyphiulus javanicus
Glyphiulus latellai
Glyphiulus latus
Glyphiulus liangshanensis
Glyphiulus lipsorum
Glyphiulus mediator
Glyphiulus mediobliteratus 
Glyphiulus melanoporus
Glyphiulus obliteratoides
Glyphiulus obliteratus
Glyphiulus paracostulifer
Glyphiulus paragranulatus
Glyphiulus parobliteratus
Glyphiulus percostulifer
Glyphiulus pergranulatus
Glyphiulus pulcher
Glyphiulus quadrohamatus
Glyphiulus rayrouchi
Glyphiulus recticullus 
Glyphiulus semicostulifer
Glyphiulus semigranulatus
Glyphiulus septentrionalis
Glyphiulus siamensis
Glyphiulus sinensis
Glyphiulus subbedosae
Glyphiulus subcostulifer
Glyphiulus subgranulatus 
Glyphiulus subobliteratus
Glyphiulus superbus
Glyphiulus vietnamicus
Glyphiulus zorzini

References

External links
Influence of the tropical millipede, Glyphiulus granulatus (Gervais, 1847), on aggregation, enzymatic activity, and phosphorus fractions in the soil

Spirostreptida